Thyrassia penangae is a species of moth in the family Zygaenidae. It is found in south-east Asia, including Peninsular Malaysia and China.

Subspecies
Thyrassia penangae penangae
Thyrassia penangae rafflesi Moore, 1859

External links
Photoperiodism of diapause induction in Thyrassia penangae (Lepidoptera: Zygaenidae)

Moths described in 1859
Procridinae